The Last Film Festival is a 2016 American comedy film starring Dennis Hopper, Leelee Sobieski, Katrina Bowden, Chris Kattan, and Jacqueline Bisset. It is written and directed by Linda Yellen. It was filmed in 2010. Hopper died before finishing the film. After extensive delays, the film was finally released theatrically in Los Angeles on September 30, 2016, followed by a VOD release. Monterey Media acquired the distribution rights in June 2016.

This was Hopper's final appearance posthumously, next to Alpha and Omega, as well as Sobieski's final credited performance before her retirement from acting in 2012.

Plot synopsis 
There are over 4,000 film festivals around the world. Where would you go if your film was turned down by 3,999 of them? When an obscure film festival is the last hope for a failing producer (Dennis Hopper) and his "disaster" of a film collides with the homespun innocence of small-town America, neither will ever be the same. Nick will do anything to get his film distributed, including manipulating his dysfunctional cast into attending the festival where Hollywood egos hilariously slam into small town politics.

Cast
Dennis Hopper as Nick Twain
Chris Kattan as Harvey
Jacqueline Bisset as Claudia Benvenuti (movie star)
Donnell Rawlings as Jermaine Johnson
Leelee Sobieski as Stalker
JoBeth Williams as Mayor
Katrina Bowden as Young Starlet
Agim Kaba as Star
Joseph Cross as Agent
Brian Berrebbi as Supermarket Manager

Reception
The film has not yet received a rating on Rotten Tomatoes, but all four of the existing reviews are negative. However, there have been a number of positive reviews from various sources. Liz Smith from The New York Social Diary called the film a "hugely amusing indie",  while the Huffington Post called it a "laugh-out-loud riot."

References

External links
 
 
 

2016 films
2016 comedy films
2016 independent films
American comedy films
American independent films
Films about Hollywood, Los Angeles
Films directed by Linda Yellen
Films shot in New Jersey
Films shot in New York City
2010s English-language films
2010s American films